The Lower Marsh Creek Presbyterian Church is an historic Presbyterian church which is located near Orrtanna, Highland Township, Adams County, Pennsylvania. 

It was listed on the National Register of Historic Places in 1980.

History and architectural features
Built in 1790, this historic church building is a three-bay wide and six-bay deep, rectangular, rubble fieldstone building, which features a semi-circular opening set in the front gable over the main entrance.

It was listed on the National Register of Historic Places in 1980.

References

Presbyterian churches in Pennsylvania
Churches on the National Register of Historic Places in Pennsylvania
Churches completed in 1790
Churches in Adams County, Pennsylvania
1790 establishments in Pennsylvania
18th-century Presbyterian church buildings in the United States
National Register of Historic Places in Adams County, Pennsylvania